KLEA (630 AM; "True Country") was a radio station broadcasting a country music format. Licensed to Lovington, New Mexico, United States, the station was owned by Lea County Broadcasting Co.

KLEA signed on December 25, 1952. The station shut down on June 30, 2017; on October 31, 2017, KLEA ceased all remaining operations. The license was surrendered to the Federal Communications Commission (FCC), which cancelled it on November 9, 2017.

References

External links
FCC Station Search Details: DKLEA (Facility ID: 36853)
  (covering 1951-1980)

Defunct radio stations in the United States
LEA
Radio stations established in 1952
1952 establishments in New Mexico
Radio stations disestablished in 2017
2017 disestablishments in New Mexico
LEA